The giraffe piano is a type of an upright piano that has a "long-necked" appearance due to a narrow, but tall, upright case, essentially a grand piano set up vertically. The design had been invented in Austria around 1805 and was manufactured throughout the first half of the 19th century. This "monstrosity" eventually evolved into the modern upright piano ("pianino"). Two closely related instruments, similar in construction, but different in shape, are called the pyramid piano and the lyre piano.

Invention 

Seuffert himself at the time acknowledged collaboration with Wachtl and Bleyer, although denied Bleyer's claims:

Design 
The narrow end of the instrument was frequently capped by a large scroll imitating giraffe's head, space next to it was frequently used for the display shelves. The pianos mostly used the German action with hammers below the keys and typically had four pedals. Until the turn of the 19th century, the pin block was placed above the keyboard, so the cases had to be quite tall. Moving the pin block to the top of the frame and sloping the string plane cleared the path to the modern upright piano design – and eventually ended the era of the 19th century upright grand pianos.

History 
The development of the upright grand versions of pianos in the 18th-19th centuries was spurred by the need to reduce the space taken by the  grand pianos, at the time about 2.5 by 1.5 meters; the size of more compact square pianos was also increasing. Vertical design, with the soundboard oriented toward audience, allowed to produce full sound in а smaller-sized instrument. The idea of a vertical placement of strings is very old: clavicytherium, an upright version of the harpsichord, was known as early as 1480.

The development then shifted to Vienna, with  creating the first pyramid piano in 1745. After a hiatus, the uprights experienced a renaissance in Austria in the early 19th century (Seuffert, Wachtl, Bleyer) with significant contributions by Christoph Ehrlich in Germany. The instruments featured two to six pedals, controlling the piano, sustaining, bassoon-register, and sometimes "janissary" (drum and bells) functions (Friederici also used hand stops).

See also
 Euphonicon

References

Sources
 
 Giraffenklavier. In: Curt Sachs: Real-Lexikon der Musikinstrumente. Julius Bard, Berlin 1913, S. 158 b
 
 
 
 
 

Piano
Austrian inventions